PipISB is a drug used in scientific research which acts as a potent and selective inverse agonist of the cannabinoid receptor CB1. It is highly selective for the CB1 receptor over CB2, with a Kd at CB1 of 1.5nM vs over 7000nM at CB2, has good blood–brain barrier penetration, and can be conveniently radiolabelled with either 11C or 18F, making it useful for mapping the distribution of CB1 receptors in the brain.

References 

Cannabinoids
CB1 receptor antagonists